Narainpur may refer to the following places in India:

 Narayanpur, Chhattisgarh
 Narayanpur district, Chhattisgarh
 Narainpur, a village in Mirzapur District, Uttar Pradesh, India
 Narainpur, a village in Pindra, Varanasi District, Uttar Pradesh
 Narainpur, a village in Kerakat, Jaunpur District, Uttar pradesh

See also
 Narayanpur (disambiguation)